Orthel Township is one of sixteen townships in Hancock County, Iowa, USA.  As of the 2000 census, its population was 247.

History
Orthel Township was founded in 1882.

Geography
According to the United States Census Bureau, Orthel Township covers an area of 35.84 square miles (92.82 square kilometers); of this, 35.77 square miles (92.64 square kilometers, 99.81 percent) is land and 0.07 square miles (0.17 square kilometers, 0.18 percent) is water.

Unincorporated towns
 Hutchins at 
(This list is based on USGS data and may include former settlements.)

Adjacent townships
 Bingham Township (north)
 Crystal Township (northeast)
 Britt Township (east)
 Erin Township (southeast)
 Boone Township (south)
 Prairie Township, Kossuth County (southwest)
 Wesley Township, Kossuth County (west)
 Buffalo Township, Kossuth County (northwest)

Cemeteries
The township contains Orthel Township Cemetery.

Major highways
  U.S. Route 18

Airports and landing strips
 Wesley Landing Strip

School districts
 Corwith-Wesley Community School District
 West Hancock Community School District
 Woden-Crystal Lake Community School District

Political districts
 Iowa's 4th congressional district
 State House District 11
 State Senate District 6

References
 United States Census Bureau 2008 TIGER/Line Shapefiles
 United States Board on Geographic Names (GNIS)
 United States National Atlas

External links
 US-Counties.com
 City-Data.com

Townships in Hancock County, Iowa
Townships in Iowa